Akman is a Turkish surname. Notable people with the surname include:

 Ayhan Akman (born 1977), Turkish retired footballer
 Hakan Akman (born 1989), Turkish footballer
 Varol Akman (born 1957), Turkish computer scientist

See also
 Pakman

Turkish-language surnames